The Shire of Heywood was a local government area about  west-southwest of Melbourne, the state capital of Victoria, Australia.

It was, for most of its life, known as the Shire of Portland.

History

Heywood was first incorporated as the Portland Road District on 25 January 1856, which became the Shire of Portland on 8 December 1863. On 23 April 1958 and 31 May 1968, it lost parts of its area to the Town of Portland, and on 1 October 1988, it was renamed the Shire of Heywood.

On 23 September 1994, the Shire of Heywood was abolished, and along with the City of Portland and most of the Shire of Glenelg, was merged into the new Shire of Glenelg.

Wards

The Shire of Heywood was divided into four ridings, each of which elected three councillors:
 East Riding
 South Riding
 West Riding
 Central Riding

Towns and localities

* Council seat.

Population

* Estimate in the 1958 Victorian Year Book.

References

External links
 Victorian Places - Heywood Shire

Heywood